Mark Anthony Dornford-May  (born 29 September 1955) is a British theatre and film director, now based in South Africa.

Personal life
Mark Dornford-May was born near Eastoft in Yorkshire. His mother was a school teacher, and his father the Drama Adviser for Cheshire County Council, receiving an MBE for services to theatre in the 1980s.

In 2002 he married South African actress and singer Pauline Malefane, and together they have three children (Dornford-May also has a daughter from an earlier marriage). In 2004 he became a permanent resident of South Africa and in 2007 he was officially inducted into the Sotho clan of his wife's family.

Career
1977-2000   
After reading Drama at Bristol University, Dornford-May was offered an assistant directorship with the Royal Shakespeare Company, working with Terry Hands on Coriolanus and The Duchess of Malfi as well as directing The Invisible Man, based on the book by Ralph Ellison dealing with black identity and the political struggle to find it, and coordinating The Plays Banned by Television Season at the then RSC Warehouse Theatre. After leaving the RSC, Dornford-May founded the Playwrights Company at Bristol Old Vic, specialising in the creation of new work which was supported and funded by Tom Stoppard.

In 1981, Dornford-May was appointed artistic director of Solent Peoples Theatre, after which he moved to Stoke-on-Trent to work at the Victoria Theatre with Peter Cheeseman. In the late 1980s he worked for a number of years teaching on the Motley Theatre Design Course then based at Riverside Studios as well as at Royal Academy of Dramatic Art and The Central School of Speech and Drama.

He also during this period directed four large-scale community plays, each involving well over a hundred people in Bradford-on-Avon, England, Milford Haven, Wales, Lille, France and Ghent, Belgium.

In the mid-1990s, Dornford-May formed Broomhill Opera, restoring and reviving Wilton's Music Hall in the East End of London. The venue was brought back to life with only voluntary help and donations in kind from a number of building supply companies. Once opened tickets were offered on a "pay as you can" basis, opening up access to all in one of the poorest boroughs in London.

In 2000, Dornford-May together with UK conductor Charles Hazlewood travelled to South Africa, where they held auditions across the country, auditioning more than 2,000 individuals to form a lyric theatre company for the Spier Festival, which would go on to become the Isango Ensemble. Dornford-May continues to run the company in South Africa.

2000–present.   
In 2001 two of the ensemble's first stage productions toured from Spier Festival in Cape Town to Wilton's Music Hall in London. From there The Mysteries - Yiimimangalisa transferred to West End and uCarmen was performed at many of the world's major arts festivals. Other stage work includes co-productions with the Young Vic of The Magic Flute – Impempe Yomlingo, featuring Mozart's score transposed for an orchestra of marimbas, and A Christmas Carol – Ikrismas Kherol. These won several awards including The Magic Flute – Impempe Yomlingo winning an Olivier Award for Best Musical Revival and the Globes de Cristal for Best Opera Production following a sold-out season at the Théâtre du Châtelet in Paris. The Magic Flute – Impempe Yomlingo also played a season in the West End. In 2009, Isango played a second West End season of The Mysteries – Yiimimangaliso.

In the summer of 2012, La Boheme – Abanxaxhi, a unique partnership with The Global Fund to Fight AIDS, Tuberculosis and Malaria, played at Hackney Empire in London for five weeks. Also in 2012 the company created a new stage version of Shakespeare's Venus & Adonis in partnership with Shakespeare's Globe.In 2013, due to the successful first run of performances the company returned to Shakespeare's Globe with Venus and Adonis and finished editing their new film Noye's Fludde, which was funded and supported by the Britten Foundation.

2014 saw the company tour the US to universal critical acclaim with sold-out performances and returned again to Shakespeare's Globe with a revival of The Mysteries - Yiimimangaliso. The company also produced another feature film Breathe - Umphefumlo, which had its premiere at the 2015 Berlin International Film Festival and had a special gala screening in South Africa in March 2015, hosted by Archbishop Desmond Tutu.In 2016, Isango Ensemble adapted Jonny Steinberg's book A Man of Good Hope in co-production with the Young Vic, the Royal Opera, Répons Foundation, BAM and Les Théâtres de la Ville de Luxembourg. The show ran for two months at the Young Vic in London in Autumn 2016 and then played at BAM, New York City's most prestigious international house in February 2017, Hong Kong Arts Festival in February 2018 and in Europe in May/June 2018 at Les Théâtres de la Ville de Luxembourg, Ruhrfestspiele Recklinghausen in Germany and Bergen International Festival in Norway. In 2019 the production toured Adelaide, Auckland, several cities in France and the United Kingdom at the Royal Opera House.

Isango also adapted Fred Khumalo's book Dancing the Death Drill, about the sinking of the SS Mendi in 2019 and premiered SS Mendi – Dancing the Death Drill at the Linbury Theatre, Royal Opera House in London in May 2019.2019 also saw Isango present productions in Norway in June (St Matthew Passion) and Australia (St Matthew Passion and SS Mendi - Dancing the Death Drill) in early September. Isango then undertook a multi-city tour of the US for nine weeks between late September and mid-November, visiting cities such as Boston, Chicago and New York with productions of Aesop's Fables, A Man of Good Hope and The Magic Flute - Impempe Yomlingo.

Isango since it was formed has toured to Australia, Austria, Canada, France, Germany, Hong Kong, Ireland, Italy, Japan, Luxembourg, Martinique, the Netherlands, Norway, Singapore, Turkey, the UK and the United States. Many countries and cities being visited several times.

Films created by Mark Dornford-May and the ensemble include u-Carmen eKhayelitsha, Son of Man, Unogumbe – Noye’s Fludde and Breathe – Umphefumlo. The films have met with popular and critical acclaim, playing at festivals including The Berlin International Film Festival, LA Pan African Film Festival, Sundance Film Festival and others in Australia, the US, the UK, Europe and Africa. They have won the Golden Bear at The Berlin International Film Festival as well as several Best Feature Awards.

Isango's work with young people has brought a sense of belief, aspiration and knowledge into the townships. It has done this by enabling them to transcend the limits of their environment and yet remain proud of their culture and their heritage.

Dornford-May was appointed Officer of the Order of the British Empire (OBE) in the 2022 Birthday Honours for services to the arts in South Africa.

Controversy
In November 2010 Dornford-May wrote an opinion piece for a South African newspaper in which he deplored the "White Face" of South African theatre and the lack of critics who could speak any African language. After publication, he received much criticism in the press from the art establishment.

Dornford-May helped to establish the Fugard Theatre in Cape Town, which opened its doors in 2010, and Isango Portobello were intended to have a residency at the new theatre. However, their residency was brought to an end and Dornford-May lost his position as creative director after less than a year amid claims of poor box office takings.

Filmography
Son of Man
U-Carmen eKhayelitsha
Unogumbe - Noye's Fludde
Breathe - Umphefumlo

References

External links
Isango Ensemble

1955 births
Living people
British film directors
Directors of Golden Bear winners
English emigrants to South Africa
Mass media people from Yorkshire
Officers of the Order of the British Empire
South African film directors